Victoria Men's Roller Derby (VMRD) is a flat track men's Roller Derby league based in Melbourne, Victoria, Australia. Founded in early 2013, VMRD is one of the premier men's roller derby leagues in Australia, having won three Australian Men's Roller Derby (AMRD) National Championships ('Men's Nationals'). The representative side for the league is called Victorian Vanguard and is often referred to as the 'Travel Team', as they travel to other cities to play opposing teams. VMRD are skater owned and operated.

VMRD are currently ranked 13th in the Men's Roller Derby Association (MRDA). To date they have played 30 games against other men's roller derby teams, with only three losses.

Current & Previous Team Members
Current skating members are #75 Justin Credible (Captain & President), #515 Pretty Skate Machine, #80 Flamin' Galah, #4 Gohan, #12 Simon Says, #934 Harry Spot'er, #3 Loulou, #7 Wolfbrother, #361 Kaneage, #05 Lucky Phil, #82 Marty McFly (Treasurer), #571 Koop Deluxe, #511 Cereal Killer, #117 Faster Chief, #66 T-Rex, #13 Dread Blocks, #1957 Mr Spew, and #99 Mav'Ricky.

Previous or current non-skating members include #1212 Moshpit No Justsu, #00 Skate Pigram, #34 Dirty 5, #22 Princess Twinkle Toes, #39 JS, #007 James Bont, #73 Hatemale, #696 Private Parts, #5 Barney, #6 Ric A Mortis, #69 Timmy Turbo, #19 Bert & Hernia and #707 Sly Voltage (Secretary).

Current Bench Coaches are Honey Collider and Victoria Beat-Her. Previous team Bench coaches included Sasha Ratbag, Giles, Florence the Machine, Mad Eye Murphy, Sass n Bite and Matt Clanahan.

History
VMRD played a solitary game in 2013, against Tasmania Men's in November, winning 294–116.

In 2014 they played three games played outside the Men's Nationals tournament (see below) with convincing wins against Tweed Valley Men's 424-92 and Adelaide's Light City 276–108. However the team suffered their first loss, to Brisbane's BCR Men's 210–165. According to some members of the team, this loss is disputed, however further details are not known. Notably, they also played the #1 Australian ranked women's team VRDL All stars (a well established  WFTDA team ranked 5th in the world at the time) losing 239–69.

In 2015 they defeated Brisbane BCR Men's 170–135, avenging the previous year's defeat. They again lost to the women's VRDL All Stars 204–111, however defeated the highly ranked Australian women's team VRDL Queen Bees 245–115.

The team started 2016 with a significant 196-61 win over Canberra's Capital Carnage and a second win over VRDL Queen Bees 223–169. This turned out to be a standout year, with VMRD winning their third Men's Nationals title, achieving their highest ever points differential (+313) and finishing the season undefeated.

2017 season

VMRD played their first game of 2017 in March, defeating Sydney Smash 217–130. In April they won the inaugural MRDA Down Under tournament  in Sydney, defeating the Thunderquads from Argentina 190–108 in a hotly contested game. In May, they were selected as one of only a handful of men's roller derby teams to play at The Big O Tournament in Eugene, Oregon in May; the largest roller derby tournament in the world. This marks the first time Australian men's derby was represented in an international roller derby tournament.

VMRD recently played the VRDL Queen Bees at the VRDL 10th Anniversary Gala. VMRD took out the win and are now the first holders of the "Cupcake Cup", a light hearted trophy between the two teams.

Men's National Championship

VMRD won the inaugural 2014 Australian Men's Roller Derby (AMRD) National Championships held in Ipswich, Queensland, defeating Tasmania Men's in the final 158–97. This was Australia's first national men's roller derby tournament and also included a team from New Zealand. Nine teams took part in the tournament.

In 2015, the team played five games at Men's Nationals, defending their title with a win over Sydney City Smash, 256–110.

VMRD defeated Sydney City Smash 303-91 in the Grand Final, in a repeat of the previous year's Grand Final. Overall, Victorian Vanguard scored a combined total of 1403 points against all teams whilst conceding only 490.

VMRD defeated Sydney City Smash 303-91 in the Grand Final, in a repeat of the previous year's Grand Final. Overall, Victorian Vanguard scored a combined total of 1403 points against other teams whilst conceding only 490.

The 2017 Men's National Championship, hosted by Coff's Coast Derby, will be held on 11–12 November in Coffs Harbour, NSW

Branding & Logo

The original Victorian Vanguard logo featured the word 'Victorian' in the background with a dominant looking warrior in front, holding a round shield with a star, under which the word "Vanguard" is displayed. The star, instantly recognisable within the roller derby community due to its importance in point scoring, is the same star worn by the jammer (point scorer) in roller derby. The shield represents defensive tactics and ability. The term 'Vanguard' originates with the medieval French avant-garde, i.e. the ward in front and refers to (in military parlance) the foremost part of an advancing army force. The use of military terms in sport and the association with battle is both well documented and deliberate.

The league has recently undergone a branding and logo change. Whilst the star and shield have been carried over from the original logo, the name Vanguard has been replaced with words Victoria Men's Roller Derby above the letters VMRD. Some say this to better reflects the league as a whole with skaters and non-skating members (as well as officials) rather than solely a team of skaters.

Men's Roller Derby World Cup

Numerous members of the team have represented Team Australia at the Men's Roller Derby World Cup, most recently in 2016 placing 3rd after defeating Canada 243–174. The 2018 World Cup will be held in Barcelona, Spain on 5–8 April

Men's Roller Derby Association
In August 2016 VMRD became an official member of the Men's Roller Derby Association (MRDA), the international governing body of men's flat track roller derby. VMRD are ranked 13th in the world, under the official MRDA ranking.

Victorian Vanguard played in the first ever MRDA sanctioned game in Australia, against Sydney City Smash in the Gand Final of the 2016 AMRD National Championships.

References

Men's roller derby
Roller derby leagues in Australia
Sporting clubs in Melbourne